Hibbertia ancistrotricha is a species of flowering plant in the family Dilleniaceae and is endemic to the south-west of Western Australia. It is a shrub with narrow oblong to linear leaves and bright yellow flowers arranged singly in leaf axils with about ten stamens fused at their bases on one side of the carpels.

Description
There are usually ten stamens, fused at the base and on one side of the two carpels that each contain four ovules. Flowering mainly occurs from September to November.

Taxonomy
Hibbertia ancistrotricha was first formally described in 2002 by Judith R. Wheeler in the journal Nuytsia from specimens she collected near Dundinin in 2001. The specific epithet (ancistrotricha) means "fish-hook hair", referring to the many hook-shaped hairs on the sepals.

Distribution and habitat
The hibbertia has a small distribution between Bendering, Harrismith and Newdegate in the Avon Wheatbelt and Mallee biogeographic regions where it is found on hills, growing in heath or shrubland in gravelly clay soils.

See also
List of Hibbertia species

References

ancistrotricha
Flora of Western Australia
Plants described in 2002